Maniac is an American psychological black comedy-drama streaming television miniseries that premiered on Netflix on September 21, 2018, after being announced in 2016. Patrick Somerville created the series and Cary Joji Fukunaga directed, basing it very loosely on the 2015 Norwegian television series of the same name (starring co-creator Espen PA Lervaag) while drawing inspiration from many more famous films. The 10-episode series stars Emma Stone, Jonah Hill, Justin Theroux, Sonoya Mizuno, Gabriel Byrne, and Sally Field. The plot follows two strangers who connect during a mind-bending pharmaceutical trial set in a retro-future New York City.

The series received positive reviews from critics upon release, with many praising its visuals, direction and acting, particularly the performances of Stone and Hill. The series received multiple accolades, including nominations for Stone's performance—both at the 23rd Satellite Awards and the 25th Screen Actors Guild Awards—and for the series' overall writing—at the 71st Writers Guild of America Awards.

Premise
Maniac follows Annie Landsberg and Owen Milgrim (see also Milgram experiments), two strangers who connect during a risky, psychologically intense, twelve-person, mind-bending pharmaceutical trial conducted by Neberdine Pharmaceutical Biotech (NPB). The experiment, originally overseen by Dr. Robert Muramoto and Dr. Azumi Fujita, later falls under the purview of the study's original designer, the eccentric Dr. James K. Mantleray. Together, Annie and Owen go on a mind-bending odyssey through various hallucinatory worlds.

Languages 
In addition to English, the original voicework features spoken Japanese and Icelandic, and (to a lesser extent) French. Netflix offers at least five different dubbings and five different subtitle options in different languages.

Cast and characters

Main
 Emma Stone as Annie Landsberg, a woman with borderline personality disorder who dwells unhealthily on her relationships. Stone also portrays Landsberg's alternate forms: Linda Marino, Arlie Kane, Annia, and Ruth in the B and C pill-induced fantasies.
 Jonah Hill as Owen Milgrim, the son of a wealthy family who potentially has schizophrenia. Having decided to make his way without his family's assistance, Milgrim struggles to hold a job and provide for himself. Hill also portrays Milgrim's alternate representations: Bruce Marino, Oliver "Ollie" Hightower, and Snorri in the B and C pill-induced fantasies.
 Justin Theroux as Dr. James K. Mantleray, a scientist working on the Neberdine Pharmaceutical Biotech (NPB) experiment. Previously removed from the experiment's team, Mantleray is brought back on following the death of Dr. Robert Muramoto.
 Sonoya Mizuno as Dr. Azumi Fujita, a scientist who runs the NPB experiment. She feels immense pressure to provide results from the experiment to her superiors.
 Gabriel Byrne as Porter Milgrim, a wealthy industrialist and father of Owen and his siblings.
 Sally Field as Dr. Greta Mantleray, a famous therapist and the mother of Dr. James K. Mantleray. Field also portrays Lady Neberdine and Queen Gertrude in the B and C pill-induced dreams respectively, and provides the voice and embodiment of GRTA, a smart computer used in the NPB experiment that has a deep emotional relationship with Dr. Muramoto and reacts strongly to his death.

Recurring

 Kathleen Choe as Soo, test subject #3 in the NPB Phase III experiment
 Danny Hoch as Alexander, test subject #5
 Stephen Hill as D'Nail, test subject #7
 Allyce Beasley as Amelia, test subject #11
 James Monroe Iglehart as Carl, an orderly at NPB
 Dai Ishiguro as Head Control Tech, an NPB employee
 Sejal Shah as First Medical Tech, an NPB employee
 Billy Magnussen as Jed Milgrim, one of Owen's brothers. Magnussen also portrays Grimsson, a man whom Owen hallucinates.
 Julia Garner as Ellie Landsberg, Annie's deceased younger sister 
 Nate Craig as Phil
 Jemima Kirke as Adelaide, Jed's fiancée whom Owen has feelings for.
 Jesse Magnussen
 Alexandra Curran as Holly Milgrim
 Rome Kanda as Dr. Robert Muramoto, a colleague of Dr. Fujita.
 Aaralyn Anderson as Belle Milgrim / Danielle Marino / Australia
 Hannah and Cailin Loesch as the Ladies of Arquesta, who first appear as guests at the Full Moon Séance. They also portray two of the McMurphies.
 Trudie Styler as Angelica Milgrim, Owen's mother and Porter's wife.
 Christian DeMarais as Mike Milgrim, one of Owen's brothers.
 Geoffrey Cantor as Frank, the Milgrim family's lawyer that is representing Jed.
 Josh Pais as Andy
 Ariel Kavoussi as Audra, an AdBuddy employee that Annie considers signing up with. Kavoussi also portrays Bianca Forsythe and provides the voice of Dragonfly.
 Grace Van Patten as Olivia Meadows, Owen's former crush whom he yelled at while experiencing his first BLIP (brief and limited psychosis) in college.
 Lev Gorn as Sokolov
 Hank Azaria as Hank Landsberg, Annie's father
 Selenis Leyva as Patricia Lugo, the intake director at Neberdine Pharmaceutical and Biotech whom Annie blackmails into getting into NBD's drug study.
 Leo Fitzpatrick as Lance, a smuggler of exotic wildlife for use in clothing and one of Sebastian's two sons.
 Jojo Gonzalez as Agent Lopez, a New York Fish and Wildlife officer searching for a ring-tailed lemur taken from the nursing home that Linda works at.
 Maxine Prescott as Mrs. Finklestein, an elderly woman that lives in Owen's apartment building. Prescott also portrays Harriet, a resident of the old folks home that Linda works at.
 Joseph Sikora as JC, a smuggler of exotic wildlife for use in clothing and one of Sebastian's two sons.
 David Fierro as Bobby, Olliver Hightower's driver. Fierro also portrays an AdBuddy employee that Owen hires.
 Glenn Wein as Lord Jopling, a guest at the Full Moon Séance. Wein also portrays an AdBuddy employee with halitosis that Owen hires.
 Jonathan Rentler as Greg Nazlund, a truck driver who crashed into Annie's car five years ago, killing her sister Ellie. Rentler also portrays a ranger that Annia encounters.

Guest
 Marcus Toji as Calvin Muramoto (episode: "Windmills"), Dr. Robert Muramoto's son and also Annie's drug dealer that initially supplies her with NPB's "A" pills, to which she is addicted. She goes to him for more and, after informing her that he is all out, suggests that she sign up for one of NPB's drug studies.
 Glenn Fleshler as Sebastian (episode: "Furs by Sebastian"), the owner of a fur shop, Furs by Sebastian, that is creating clothing out of exotic animals. Linda and Bruce attempt to take back a ring-tailed lemur that he had stolen from them.
 Jennifer Ikeda as Therapist (episode: "Option C"), Owen's therapist at the Horton Psychiatric Facility where he is sent after condemning his brother in court.
 Ben Sinclair as “friend” (episode: “Option C”), Annie's friend proxy for Owen before visiting him in the asylum.

Episodes
Maniac features 10 episodes, each running between 26–47 minutes. All episodes to the miniseries were released simultaneously on September 21, 2018.

Production

Development
The series was officially announced in March 2016, with Netflix ordering the production straight-to-series that same month. On March 18, 2016, it was announced that Paramount Television and Anonymous Content were producing a television series to be directed by Cary Joji Fukunaga. The half-hour dark comedy series was reported to be executive produced by Fukunaga, Emma Stone, Jonah Hill, Michael Sugar, and Doug Wald. Ashley Zalta was also announced as a co-executive producer. At the time, the series was being shopped to various networks and was searching for a writer. Less than a week later, it was announced that Netflix was finalizing a deal for a straight-to-series order for a first season consisting of ten episodes. On October 21, 2016, it was announced that Patrick Somerville would write the series. On July 29, 2018, it was announced during the annual Television Critics Association's summer press tour that the series would premiere on September 21, 2018.

Casting
Alongside the initial series announcement, it was reported that Emma Stone and Jonah Hill were finalizing deals to star in the series. In August 2017, it was announced that Sonoya Mizuno had been cast as a series regular and that Justin Theroux and Julia Garner would appear in a recurring capacity. On September 13, 2017, it was reported that Jemima Kirke had been cast in a recurring role. On October 5, 2017, it was announced that Sally Field had joined the cast in a recurring role. On February 23, 2018, it was reported Billy Magnussen had been cast in the series.

Filming
Principal photography for the series began on August 15, 2017, in New York City and was expected to conclude by the end of November 2017.

Music
Dan Romer composed the soundtrack to Maniac with collection of orchestral and electronic musical pieces. The soundtrack was released on a double LP by Waxwork Records on January 10, 2020.

Release

On September 13, 2018, the series held its world premiere at the Southbank Centre in London, England. On September 20, 2018, the series held its American premiere at Center 415 in New York City.

Reception

Critical response
The series was met with a positive response from critics. On the review aggregation website Rotten Tomatoes, the series holds an 84% approval rating, with an average rating of 7.6 out of 10 based on 103 reviews. The website's critical consensus reads, "Maniac enthralls with its dazzling visuals, adventurous narrative, and striking performances from both Emma Stone and Jonah Hill." Metacritic, which uses a weighted average, assigned the series a score of 76 out of 100 based on 24 critics, indicating "generally favorable reviews".

In a positive review, Varietys Daniel D'Addario commended the series saying, "The beautifully made Maniac plunges viewers into a fictional world that's both divergent from our own and instantly recognizable—and then reinvents itself several times over, skittering across time, space and genre to tell a story of connection that feels urgent and deeply, painfully human...As a trial of something new, Maniac passes every test, and ascends instantly to take its place among the very best TV of the year." In another favorable assessment, The Washington Posts Hank Stuever described the series as "oddly mesmerizing" and offered it qualified praise saying, "Maniac starts off too absorbed in its own complicated structure, but once Owen and Annie are strapped in at the lab (and experience an accidental melding of their subconscious states), the show becomes a visually compelling romp through highly detailed dreams and personal discoveries." Describing it as "exhilarating to watch and a lot to process", Vultures Jen Chaney called the series "one of the fall season's best".

In a more negative critique, Darren Franich of Entertainment Weekly awarded the series a grade of "C−" and criticized it saying, "For all its manic poses and deflationary snark, it's ultimately patronizingly sentimental. [...] Maniac asks big questions about reality, and then settles for the limpest possible cinematic representations of that reality."

Awards and nominations

References

External links
 
 

2010s American comedy television miniseries
2010s American comedy-drama television series
2010s American drama television miniseries
2010s American science fiction television series
2018 American television series debuts
2018 American television series endings
American television series based on Norwegian television series
Borderline personality disorder in fiction
English-language Netflix original programming
Television about mental health
Television series by Anonymous Content
Television series by Paramount Television